Patricia Hernández (born 8 September 1970) is a Spanish basketball player. She competed in the women's tournament at the 1992 Summer Olympics.

References

1970 births
Living people
Spanish women's basketball players
Olympic basketball players of Spain
Basketball players at the 1992 Summer Olympics
Sportspeople from Las Palmas
20th-century Spanish women